The Letov Š-1 was a Czechoslovak single-engined, two-seat biplane surveillance aircraft. It was the first military aircraft built in Czechoslovakia. It was designed by Alois Šmolík at Letov Kbely. The Š-1 first flew in 1920.

Variants
SH-1  Hiero L engines. Later redesignated Š-1. 28 built.
SM-1  Maybach Mb.IVa engines. Later redesignated Š-2. 64 built.
Sm A 1 Commercial variant. Canopy over rear cockpit for two passengers.

Specifications (Š-1)

References

Further reading

 
 

1920s Czechoslovakian military reconnaissance aircraft
S-1
Biplanes
Single-engined tractor aircraft
Aircraft first flown in 1920